Aad de Koning (25 December 1928 – 29 May 2010) was a Dutch speed skater. He competed in three events at the 1948 Winter Olympics.

Personal
De Koning was born in Purmerend and died in the Zuidoostbeemster in May 2010, aged 81. Several people in his family were speed skaters.

References

External links
 

1928 births
2010 deaths
Dutch male speed skaters
Olympic speed skaters of the Netherlands
Speed skaters at the 1948 Winter Olympics
People from Purmerend
Sportspeople from North Holland